They Marched into Sunlight: War and Peace, Vietnam and America, October 1967 is a 2004 book written by David Maraniss. The book centers around the Battle of Ong Thanh and a protest at the University of Wisconsin–Madison.

It was a finalist for the Pulitzer Prize for History in 2004, and won the J. Anthony Lukas Book Prize that same year.

Individuals mentioned
Terry de la Mesa Allen, Jr., commander of 2nd Battalion, 28th Infantry Regiment, U.S. 1st Infantry Division, son of Major General Terry de la Mesa Allen; killed in action in Vietnam October 17, 1967
Lt. Clark Welch
Donald Holleder
Vo Minh Triet
Paul Soglin
Jack Schroder
Carl Woody Woodard
Peter Coyote
Dick Cheney
Lynne Cheney

Television documentary
The 2005 documentary film, Two Days in October, was based on this book, and produced as part of the PBS series American Experience during season 18. It won a Peabody Award. In the UK, it was also broadcast by BBC Four as How Vietnam was Lost, as part of the channel's Storyville series.

Film adaptation
At one point, both Tom Hanks and Gary Goetzman had the rights for making a feature film version of Maraniss's book. Their production company Playtone was very interested in having Paul Greengrass (United 93, The Bourne Ultimatum) direct the film.

Editions
; September 23, 2003, Simon & Schuster, 592 pages (Hardcover)
; September 28, 2004, Simon & Schuster, 572 pages (Trade Paperback)

References

External links
 
Interview with David Maraniss at the Pritzker Military Museum & Library
Presentation by Maraniss on They Marched Into Sunlight at the Wisconsin Historical Society, April 8, 2002, C-SPAN
Part one and Part two of interview with Maraniss on They Marched Into Sunlight, September 28 and November 16, 2003, C-SPAN

2004 non-fiction books
Ambassador Book Award-winning works
Vietnam War books
University of Wisconsin–Madison